ECID may refer to:
 Ecid, American rapper
 A technical term involved in Apple security SHSH blob